Karl Altmann (January 8, 1904 - December 29, 1960) was an Austrian official and politician of the Communist Party of Austria. He was senate councilor of the Municipality of Vienna. After the end of the Second World War in 1945 he became Undersecretary of Justice in the Provisional Government of Karl Renner, from 1945 to 1947 he was Federal Minister for Electrification and Energy. He was the husband of Helene Postranecky.

References

1904 births
1960 deaths
Politicians from Vienna
Communist Party of Austria politicians